Le Galion is a French perfumery, known for its high-end perfume. Among its brands are La Rose, Sortilège, Snob, and Lanvin. Le Galion was considered such a luxurious item that the Sortilège perfumes were once given as gifts at The Stork Club of New York City, associated with its wealthy clientele, which led it to becoming known as the "fragrance of the Stork Club".

The firm was involved with a notable trademark dispute over its Snob perfume in which they successfully challenged Jean Patou in the United States.

References

External links
Official site

Luxury brands
Perfume houses
Cosmetics companies of France